TVMNews+ (formerly TVM 2) is a terrestrial television network in Malta, operated by national broadcaster Public Broadcasting Services. Unlike the more wide-ranging TVM network, TVMNews+ focuses primarily on newscasting and educational television.

History
The network was originally launched as Education 22, an educational television service operated by the Maltese government's Ministry of Education, Employment and the Family. In March 2012 responsibility for the channel was shifted from the Ministry to the national broadcaster, Public Broadcasting Services (PBS), and the network began broadcasting as TVM2 on 8 March 2012. Following a restructuring of operations within PBS, as from October 2021 the network has been broadcasting under the name of TVMNews+.

Programming
TVMNews+ primarily airs news and educational programmes, including direct learning programmes on Maltese history and culture as well as coverage of current events. It also airs a nightly newscast in Maltese Sign Language for persons who are deaf or hearing impaired.It also airs news broadcasting and also an English version. Like TVM, special programmes like Maltese Carnival, Football and festivals are sometimes broadcast yearly.

References

External links
 

Television stations in Malta
Television channels and stations established in 2012
2012 establishments in Malta